The 1926 Copa Estímulo Final was the final that decided the winner of the 2nd (and last) edition of this Argentine domestic cup. Boca Juniors defeated Sportivo Balcarce 3–1 at San Lorenzo de Almagro Stadium.

Qualified teams

Overview 
Boca Juniors shared Group D with Sportsman, Argentino de Quilmes and Del Plata, playing each other in a single round-robin. Boca finished 1st therefore qualified to the semifinals v Chacarita Juniors. As the team from San Martín withdrew, Boca Juniors directly qualified to the final, held at San Lorenzo de Almagro's venue, Estadio Gasómetro, on 27 Jan 1927.

Although some versions state the cup had a third edition in 1929, it was indeed played under the Primera División season format (being Gimnasia y Esgrima (LP) the winner).

Match details

References

e
1926 in Argentine football
Football in Buenos Aires